Projection Peak is a peak rising above the head of Garwood Glacier at the southwest extremity of Hobbs Ridge in Victoria Land. It was named by the New Zealand Geographic Board (NZGB) in 1993 in association with several glaciers on this ridge (Bonne, Cassini and Mollweide Glaciers) that are named after types of map projections.

Mountains of Victoria Land
Scott Coast